Vännäs HC is a Swedish ice hockey club based in Vännäs, Västerbotten County.  After being promoted from Division 2 in 2012, the club plays in Division 1, the third tier of ice hockey in Sweden.

External links
 Official website
 Profile on Eliteprospects.com

Ice hockey teams in Sweden
Baseball teams established in 1979
1979 establishments in Sweden
Ice hockey teams in Västerbotten County